Carl Christian Rafn (January 16, 1795 – October 20, 1864) was a Danish historian, translator and antiquarian.   His scholarship to a large extent focused on translation of Old Norse literature and related Northern European ancient history. He was also noted for his early advocacy of the recognition of  Norse colonization of North America.

Biography
Carl Christian Rafn was born in Brahesborg on the island of Fyn in Funen County, Denmark. After attending the Odense Cathedral School  (Odense Katedralskole), he entered the University of Copenhagen where he earned his law degree and graduated (1816). After having been employed as a lieutenant with the Funen light dragoons in Odense, in 1820, he became a teacher  in Latin and grammar at the Army Cadet Academy (Landkadetakademiet) in Copenhagen.

Rafn was particularly interested in discovering the location of Vinland as mentioned in Norse sagas. Together with  Icelandic scholar Finnur Magnússon and Danish linguist Rasmus Rask, he founded the Royal Norse Ancient Writings Society (Det Kongelige nordiske Oldskriftselskab). He was also a member of the Arnamagnæan Institute (Den Arnamagnæanske Kommission) which managed the Arnamagnæan Foundation
(Det Arnamagnæanske Legat), custodians for the collection of manuscripts from 17th-century Icelandic scholar Árni Magnússon.

Rafn published much of his work in 1837 in the Antiquitates Americanæ. It is considered the first scholarly exposition of pre-Columbian Norse exploration. At the time of Rafn's research, the Norse sagas concerning Vinland were considered by most scholars to be mere legends. The ideas advanced by Rafn found new support since the 1960s with the discovery of the Norse settlement at L'Anse aux Meadows in northern Newfoundland, Canada.

In 1836, he was admitted as a member of the Royal Danish Society for History  (Det kongelige danske Selskab for Fædrelandets Historie).  In 1836 he was also elected a member of the American Antiquarian Society.  He was a member of numerous other foreign associations and societies and received the philosophical and legal doctorate from abroad.

He died in 1864 at the age of 69 and was buried at  Assistens Cemetery in Copenhagen.

Selected works

Committee
 1821–1826 – Nordiske Kæmpehistorier (3 vols.)
 1824 – Jomsvikingesaga
 1825–1837 – Fornmanna sögur (12 vols.)
 1826 – Krákumál
 1826 – 1827 – Kong Olaf Tryggvesøns Saga (3 vols.)
 1829–1830 – Fornaldarsögur Norðrlanda (3 vols.)
 1829–1830 – Nordiske Fortidssagaer (3 vols.)
 1832 – Færeyínga saga
 1837 – Antiqvitates Americana
 1838–1854 – Grønlands historiske Mindesmærker  (3 vols.)
 1850–1858 – Antiquités Russes d'après les monuments historique des anciens et des Islandais Scandinaves (2 vols.)
 1852 – Saga Játvarðar konúngs Hin Helga (with Jón Sigurðsson)
 1856 –  Antiquités de l'Orient

Journals
 1832–1836 – Nordisk Tidsskrift for Oldkyndighed  (3 vols.)
 1836–1863 – Annaler for nordisk Oldkyndighed  (og Historie) (23 vols.)
 1836–1860 – Mémoires de la société des antiquaires du Nord
 1843–1863 – Antikvarisk Tidsskrift  (7 vols.)

See also
Viking revival
Norse colonization of the Americas

References

Other sources
Jespersen, Knud J.V.  (1990) Carl Christian Rafn og det Fyenske Militair-Bibliothek (Odenses bibliotekshistorie, Odense Universitetsforlag)

Related reading
Borring, Laurits Stephan  (1864) Notices on the life and writings of Carl Christian Rafn: Permanent secretary of the Royal Society of Northern Antiquaries, Counsellor of Conference
Gröndal, Benedikt (1869) Breve fra og til Carl Christian Rafn med en Biographi
Widding, Ole  (1964) Carl Christian Rafn – Biographie of Old Nordic-Icelandic Studies

External links
Facsimile of a map from the works of Carl Christian Rafn
 The Norse Discovery of America (London: Norrœna Society. 1906. Rasmus B. Anderson, editor in chief) 

1795 births
1864 deaths
People from Assens Municipality
University of Copenhagen alumni
 Danish antiquarians
Danish classical scholars
19th-century Danish educators
19th-century Danish historians
Members of the American Antiquarian Society
Knights of the Order of the Dannebrog
Grand Crosses of the Order of the Dannebrog
Burials at Assistens Cemetery (Copenhagen)